Renaud Hantson (29 March 1963) is a French singer, musician, drummer, actor and writer. Besides his solo career, he has been part of hard rock and rock bands like Satan Jokers and Furious Zoo.

Musicals
He has also taken part in various rock operas by Michel Berger and Luc Plamondon.
1988: Starmania - role of Ziggy (on stage and on Starmania album / role of Johnny Rockfort (only on stage))
1990: La Légende de Jimmy two roles, as James Dean and a teenager
1993: Les Enfoirés chantent Starmania - particularly in the song "Ziggy" 
1999 to 2001: Notre Dame de Paris - Gringoire

Discography

Albums
1987: Ne plus dire qu'on est seul (Vogue)
1988: Briseur de cœurs (Vogue)
1990: Petit Homme (Vogue) 
1992: A·M·O·U·R (Tréma)
1994: Des plaies et des bosses (Tréma) 
1997: Seulement humain (Tréma) 
2002: Renaud Hantson (Universal)
2008: Je couche avec moi (XIII Bis Records)
2009: Best of (XIII Bis Records)
2011: Opéra Rock (Rebel Music)(cover+remix)
2012: La Fissure du temps (Rebel Music)
2013: Tout recommencer (Rebel Music) 

as part of Furious Zoo
1992: Furioso
2005: Furioso II
2006: Furioso III
2008: Furioso IV
2010: Furioso V: A.nal O.riented R.ock
2012: Wock n' Woll
2014: Back to Blues Rock

as part of Satan Jokers
1983: Les fils du metal
1984: Trop fou pour toi
1985: III
2006: Best of Live
2008: Hardcore Collectors
2009: SJ 2009
2009: Fetish X
2011: AddictionS
2013: Psychiatric
2014: sex opera

Singles
1987: "Y'a pas d'mystères"
1987: "Ne plus dire qu'on est seul"
1988: "Voyeur"
1988: "C'est du sirop" 
1990: "Petit homme"
1990: "Tuer la guerre"
1992: "A·M·O·U·R"
1992: "Ça ne suffit pas toujours"
1992: "Il faut donner"
1994: "Apprendre à vivre sans toi"
1994: "Quatre saisons" (with France Gall)
1994: "Si tu te bas"
1997: "En partance"
1997: "Seulement humain"
1997: "Féminin singulier"
2002: "Je perds le sud"
2002: "Lise et Laure"
2008: "Le Feu aux yeux"
2008: "Écoute le silence"
2011: "Quand on arrive en ville"
2011: "Can You Feel the Love Tonight"
2011: "Out Here on My Own"
2012: "Je t'aime ainsi"
2013: "Poudre aux yeux"
2013: "Un pas vers le ciel"

References

1963 births
Living people
French male singers
French rock singers
French  drummers
Male drummers